The Piano Concerto in C-sharp minor, FP 146, by French composer Francis Poulenc is the last of his five concertos. Written in 1949 on commission from the Boston Symphony Orchestra, it has three movements and a duration of about 19 minutes.

Background
The tuneful, energetic concerto was commissioned by the Boston Symphony Orchestra to restore relations between Paris, Poulenc's hometown, and the United States after the Second World War. It was premiered by the BSO with Charles Munch conducting and the composer at the piano on 6 January 1950, but was not particularly well received. It was noted that there was "more sympathy than real enthusiasm," which the composer attributed to the notion that the audience had listened to too much Sibelius. One critic wrote in Le Figaro: "Certainly it isn’t a concerto at all but a little picture of manners, done up by a minor master." But Poulenc wrote: "I lead an austere existence in this very Puritan town."

Structure
Each of the concerto's three movements is shorter than the one before:
 Allegretto — A first theme in C sharp minor is exposed by the soloist to which other melodic motifs in a lyrical and sensual spirit gather around. A median largo of mystical inspiration follows before the resumption of the initial theme. Average performance time: 10 minutes.
 Andante con moto — First rustic and melancholic theme in E flat major, then follows a passage marked gracieux before the resumption of the starting theme and a coda where E flat major alternates with E flat minor. Average performance time: 5 minutes.
 Rondeau à la française — Finale which, inspired by a negro spiritual drawn from a sailor's song, the rhythm of Brazilian matchiche and the French-cancan adopts a very casual and popular tone. F-sharp minor. Average performance time: 4.5 minutes.

The first, reminiscent of various Rachmaninoff themes, meanders here and there, never quite making up its mind; there are subdued hints of the approaching Poulenc opera Dialogues of the Carmelites. The Andante con moto acquires a certain airy repose after its tender and sad start. The last movement incorporates the old sea chant A la claire fontaine, which begins the same and was thus mistaken for Stephen Foster's Swanee River; Poulenc incorporates various Brazilian Maxixe rhythms.

References

Bibliography

External links
 
 Piano Concerto performance by François-René Duchâble, James Conlon, and the Rotterdam Philharmonic Orchestra on Youtube

Compositions by Francis Poulenc
1949 compositions
Poulenc
Compositions in C-sharp minor
Music commissioned by the Boston Symphony Orchestra